Martin Dennis is a Canadian-born British television director. He won the BAFTA for situation comedy in 2005, having been nominated in 1989, 1996, and 1998.

Early life and education 
Dennis was born in Toronto and lived there briefly until his family moved to Surrey. He attended the University of Birmingham.

Career 
Dennis joined the BBC in 1980 as a runner. He soon became a production manager and was part of the crew behind 'Allo, 'Allo, Don't Wait Up, and Hi-De-Hi. In 1980, Dennis became the director of 'Allo, 'Allo and in 1991 he directed the first series of Men Behaving Badly for Hartswood Films, and went on to direct all the subsequent series and specials. He has also directed Birds of a Feather when it was revived by ITV in 2014.

Since 2012, he has directed Friday Night Dinner on Channel 4.

References

External links 
 
 

Alumni of the University of Birmingham
BBC people
British television directors
Living people
Year of birth missing (living people)